= Bedrockk =

American electronic musician, producer, vocalist and DJ

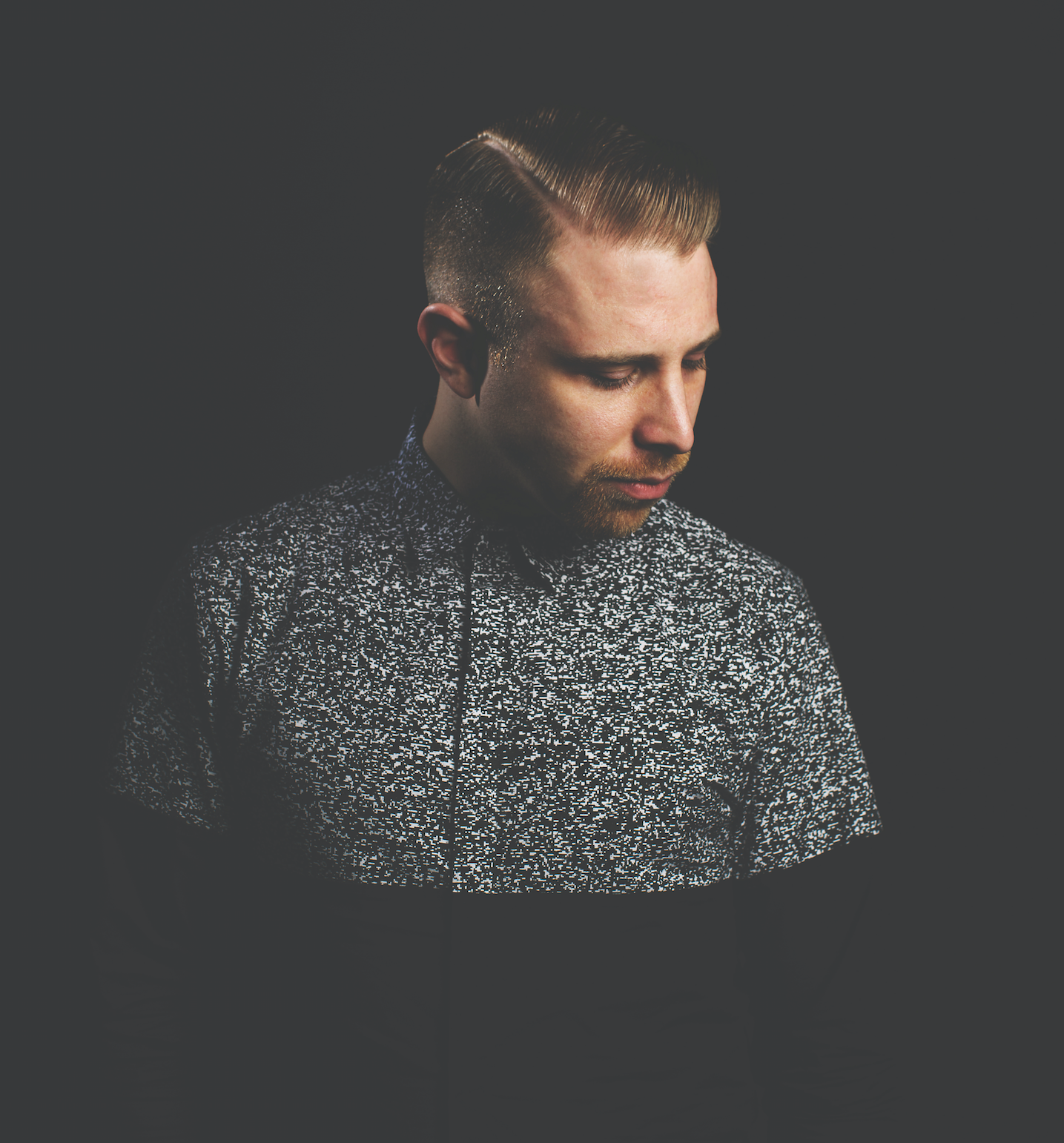

Background information
- Born: Dave Marquess; 1986 (age 39–40); Long Beach, California
- Genres: Electronic; Soul; R&B; Club
- Occupations: Record producer; Vocalist; DJ; Music executive
- Years active: 2012–present
- Label: DIRTY//CLEAN

Bedrockk is an American electronic musician, DJ, producer, and vocalist. He founded the record label DIRTY//CLEAN in January 2012, marked by his first EP release, Get Born. Drawing on a wide range of influences, from early delta blues and soul music, to modern club music, Bedrockk has released three EP's and been featured on top music curators such as Billboard, Complex, Clash Magazine, Thump (Vice), and more.

== Discography ==
=== EPs ===
- Get Born (2012)
- Black & White (2014)
- Ultra Violet (2015)

=== Singles ===
- Foreva (2013)
- Sometimes (2013)
- Echoes (2013)
- Moving Motion (2013)
- Don’t Hold Back (2013)
- Believe (2013)
- Faded (feat. Swoonz) (2013)
- Steady Are U Ready (feat. Mosis) (2014)
- Cloud Ceilings (2014)
- Bottle Sippin (2014)
- Higher (2014)
- Oceans Lifted (2015)
- Flux Eternal (2015)
- Terminal (feat. Lyrique) (2016)
- Show Me (feat. Lyrique) (2016)
- Tarantino (2016)
- Body Moves (feat. Lyrique) (2017)

== Notes ==
1. Williams, Nick (March 25, 2016). "Bedrockk Shares Sleek Dancehall Rework of Robin S.'s 'Show Me Love' Feat. Lyrique: Exclusive". Billboard (magazine)
2. Nappy (April 25, 2014). "Exclusive: Bedrockk - "Bottle Sippin". Complex (magazine).
3. Murray, Robin (June 11, 2015). "Premiere: Bedrockk - 'Just Like You'. Clash (magazine)
4. Thump Staff Writer (July 15, 2015). "Notes From The Underground: The Most Vital Tracks and News From the Worldwide Underground". Thump (Vice)
5. Bedrockk Feat Swoonz "Faded". Soundcloud, December 2013.
6. McCaskill, Clark (January 27, 2015). “Submerse yourself in the bass soundscape of Bedrockk’s “Oceans Lifted” [Premiere]”. Earmilk
7. Hirsch, Adam (November 5, 2013). "Bedrockk - Believe [RTT Premiere] + Bonus Tracks". Run The Trap
8. Malan, Jamie (July 21, 2015). “Bedrockk Shares New Track ‘Dream City’ ”. AXS TV
